Laci Green (born October 18, 1989) is an American YouTuber. Her content focuses on sex education; Green also hosted Braless, the first MTV YouTube channel, as part of a 12-week deal with MTV. The first episode aired November 4, 2014. In 2016, Time named her one of the 30 most influential people on the Internet.  In 2017, she celebrated her tenth anniversary on YouTube.

Early life and education
Green was born in Utah. Her mother is a Mormon from a small American town, and her father, from a Shia Muslim family, is from Iran. When she was two years old, her family moved to Portland, Oregon, and when she was twelve, they moved to California for her father's job. As she grew older she began to question the Mormon faith because of its strict gender roles and expectations of her as a woman. Growing up, Green was interested in theater and was supported by her mother, who owns a theater company.

In 2011, Green graduated from the University of California, Berkeley with a bachelor's degree in legal studies and education.

Career
Green's videos were originally a hobby, but as they grew more popular, she took greater interest in sex education. As of October 2014, her YouTube channel had more than 1,000,000 subscribers. As a sex educator, she has given lectures at several universities and on behalf of Planned Parenthood. Green is a former co-host of DNews, a YouTube channel with short science-based shows, launched by the Discovery News website. On January 18, 2013, Green appeared on Dr. Phil in an episode titled "Girls Who Bash Girls Who Dress Sexy". She spoke about how she believes slut-shaming is wrong and how it is used to degrade a woman's sexuality.

Green advances the sex-positive movement in her videos and lectures. She has said that she wants to "get people to talk about sex in a way that isn't shameful, awkward, or weird. People are uneducated and this creates so many stigmas that don't need to be there."

After fellow YouTuber Sam Pepper posted a video of himself grabbing women's bottoms, Green wrote an open letter, co-signed by several other YouTube bloggers, asking Pepper to "stop violating women". Channel 4 and the BBC interviewed her about sexual harassment in the YouTube community.

In 2012, Green received death threats via the Internet for using the term "tranny" in a video in 2009; she apologized and took the video down, saying that the comment had been made years earlier when she had been very uneducated. After a month-long break, she returned to her YouTube channel in August 2012.

Green won a 2016 Streamy Award for Science or Education.

In May 2017, Green had a series of dialogs on Twitter, in her own videos, and in the videos of other YouTubers, with critics of identity politics, gender identity, and modern feminism. She said that some of the points these critics made were "more valid than they'd previously seemed" and though she did not repudiate any of her past positions on these issues, the critics welcomed Green's overtures.

In 2018, Green published her first book, Sex Plus: Learning, Loving and Enjoying Your Body.

On 3 September 2019, Green launched a podcast, titled Indirect Message, which "explores how the internet is changing society."

Personal life
Soon after leaving the Church of Jesus Christ of Latter-day Saints, Green fell into a state of deep depression and struggled with self-harm and suicidal thoughts. She began to work with a therapist who helped her through her depression. She is now an atheist, though occasionally attends the Unitarian Universalist church.

Green identifies as pansexual. She now lives in Los Angeles.

See also
 List of LGBT people from Portland, Oregon

References

External links

 
 

1989 births
Activists from California
Activists from Utah
American atheists
American feminists
American former Christians
American people of Iranian descent
American women podcasters
American podcasters
American Unitarian Universalists
American women bloggers
American bloggers
American YouTubers
Atheist feminists
Discovery Channel people
Educators from California
American women educators
Educators from Oregon
Educators from Utah
Former Latter Day Saints
Internet activists
LGBT feminists
LGBT people from Oregon
LGBT people from Utah
LGBT Unitarian Universalists
LGBT YouTubers
Living people
Pansexual women
People associated with Planned Parenthood
People from San Francisco
Sex-positive feminists
Streamy Award winners
University of California, Berkeley alumni
Victims of cyberbullying
Video bloggers
Women video bloggers
Writers from Salt Lake City
21st-century American women
20th-century LGBT people
21st-century American LGBT people
Pansexual entertainers